Simon Desthieux (born 3 December 1991) is a French biathlete, olympic champion and world champion.

He competed in the 2014 Winter Olympics for France, where he finished 45th in the sprint and 21st in the pursuit. Desthieux won his first World Championship medal in Hochfilzen 2017 when he was a part of men's relay team that became second. Next year he was a part of France's mixed relay team in the 2018 Winter Olympics and won his first Olympic gold medal. In Antholz-Anterselva 2020 won his first World Championship title with men's relay. 

He announced his retirement after the 2021/22 season.

Career

Olympic Games
2 medals (1 gold, 1 silver)

World Championships
3 medals (1 gold, 2 silver)

*The single mixed relay was added as an event in 2019.

Biathlon World Cup
World Cup rankings

Individual victories
2 victories (1 Sp, 1 MS)

Relay victories
11 victories; victories at Winter Olympics are not counted as World Cup victories but are listed here.

Junior World Championships

References

External links

1991 births
Biathletes at the 2014 Winter Olympics
Biathletes at the 2018 Winter Olympics
Biathletes at the 2022 Winter Olympics
French male biathletes
Living people
Olympic biathletes of France
People from Belley
Biathlon World Championships medalists
Medalists at the 2018 Winter Olympics
Medalists at the 2022 Winter Olympics
Olympic medalists in biathlon
Olympic gold medalists for France
Olympic silver medalists for France
Sportspeople from Ain